Varvara Andreyevna Gracheva (born 2 August 2000) is a Russian tennis player.

Gracheva has a career-high WTA singles ranking of No. 54, achieved on  20 March 2023. She has won seven singles titles at tournaments of the ITF Circuit and reached one WTA final.

Gracheva made her main-draw debut on the WTA Tour at the 2019 Ladies Open Lausanne, where she qualified by defeating Julia Grabher in the final round.

In July 2019, she qualified for the Washington Open and won her first WTA Tour main-draw match, defeating Anna Blinkova.

Career

Juniors: Decent success
Gracheva reached a career-high ranking of 19 in her junior career, winning four Grade-2 events.

2017: First professional tournaments
Gracheva played her first professional events in 2017, starting off unranked but managed to reach a ranking of No. 647 by the end of the year, after reaching three consecutive $15k tournaments in Hammamet, Tunisia, defeating the likes of Fiona Ferro in the process.

2018: Last junior year, top 500 debut
After defeating Sofia Shapatava to win a $15k tournament in Antalya, Turkey to begin her 2018 season, Gracheva returned to playing her final junior tournaments and did not compete on the ITF Circuit for six months. Nonetheless, she was able to reach her first $25k quarterfinal in Périgueux and made her top 500 debut in July as a result. Gracheva had three top 300 wins, including one over Maryna Zanevska in the qualifying rounds of the Al Habtoor Tennis Challenge.

She ended the year with a 28–13 winning record on the professional tour, as the world No. 447.

2019: Rapid rise in the rankings, ITF success, WTA Tour and top 125 debut
Despite a sluggish start to the year which saw Gracheva reach just one quarterfinal on hard courts, she achieved good results on clay. Coming through the qualifying rounds at a $25k event in Chiasso, she won the biggest title of her career and entered the top 400 for the first time in her career. She followed it up with an upset over 118th-ranked Nao Hibino at the $80k Open de Cagnes-sur-Mer.

Gracheva went on to win two $25k titles, the first in Caserta, Italy, and second at the Open Montpellier Méditerranée Métropole Hérault.

With her ranking qualifying her for some WTA tournaments, she made her debut on the WTA Tour at the Ladies Open Lausanne, where she qualified for the main draw by defeating Julia Grabher in the final round, losing just two games. She lost to Han Xinyun in the first round, in straight sets. Gracheva then competed on hardcourts for the first time since April at the Washington Open, where she qualified for the main draw once again. This time, she earned her first main draw win over Anna Blinkova in three sets, for her first top 100 win, and then fell to world No. 31, Hsieh Su-wei, in a final-set tiebreak. Nonetheless, she secured herself a top 200 debut. 

Competing in a Grand Slam championship for the first time in her career, she advanced to the final qualifying round of the US Open after defeating Martina Trevisan and Danka Kovinić, in straight sets. She was defeated in the final round by Richèl Hogenkamp, in two tight sets.

Gracheva then returned onto clay, starting a 14-match winning streak with two consecutive titles at $60k events, the Open de Saint-Malo and the Open de Valencia. In Saint-Malo, she earned top 100 wins over Aliona Bolsova (who reached the fourth round at Roland Garros) and Natalia Vikhlyantseva before defeating Marta Kostyuk in the final. In Valencia, she dropped just 22 games all week and beat Tamara Korpatsch to win her second consecutive title. She reached a career-high ranking of 121 after the tournament.

Playing at her home tournament, the Kremlin Cup, for the first time in her career, she qualified for the main draw and beat Ajla Tomljanović to reach the second round. She led Anastasia Pavlyuchenkova by a set and a break, but could not hold onto her lead as she fell in three sets. 

She ended the year with a 70–26 record, ending the year as the world No. 105 despite starting the year as No. 447, and was labelled as one of the biggest rising stars.

2020: Consistency on the WTA Tour, US Open third round, top 100 debut
Gracheva reached the final round of qualifying at the Australian Open with wins over Chloé Paquet and Olga Danilović, but fell at the final hurdle to former world No. 45, Johanna Larsson. It was the beginning of a five-match losing streak for the Russian before the COVID-19 pandemic halted the 2020 WTA Tour. Nonetheless, she was able to make her top 100 debut on March 2, 2020, just in time before the suspension of the tournaments.

She was part of the first WTA tournament of the tour's resumption, the Palermo Ladies Open, as the top seed in qualifying. She ended her losing streak with a win over local wildcard Matilde Paoletti, but was stunned by Martina Trevisan in the final qualifying round.

Gracheva finally made her Grand Slam main-draw debut at the US Open, and upset the higher-ranked Paula Badosa in straight sets to triumph on her main draw debut. In the second round, she pulled off one of the biggest comebacks in history by overturning a 1–6, 1–5 deficit against 30th seed Kristina Mladenovic, saving multiple match points to reach the third round for the first time in her career. Although she eventually lost to eighth seed Petra Martić in a tight contest in the third round, her performance made her receive the limelight.

Gracheva also made her French Open main-draw debut, but lost to eventual quarterfinalist and third seed, Elina Svitolina, in a straight-setter in the first round. Her year ended with a second-round appearance at the Upper Austria Ladies Linz, after defeating Katarina Zavatska in the first round.

She ended the year inside the top 100 for the first time in her career, with a 10–14 win–loss record, but three of those wins coming at WTA Tour main-draw level.

2021: First full WTA Tour season & first WTA semifinal, top 80 debut
Gracheva was part of the contingent that travelled to Melbourne for the Australian Open, starting her season with a tough three-set win over Lizette Cabrera in the first round of the Yarra Valley Classic. She triumphed on her Australian Open main-draw debut, defeating compatriot Anna Blinkova before losing to another compatriot, Veronika Kudermetova, in the second round. Gracheva ended her journey in Australia with a second-round appearance at the Phillip Island Trophy, stunning former Grand Slam champion, Sloane Stephens, in straight sets. She lost to eventual champion Daria Kasatkina.

After a poor run of results, Gracheva reached the semifinals of the WTA 125 Open de Saint-Malo, upsetting second seed Rebecca Peterson in straight sets. She reached the third round of the French Open for the first time in her career, upsetting Camila Giorgi in the second round before losing in straight sets to Marta Kostyuk.

Her first grass-court tournaments ended in defeat at the Bad Homburg Open and Wimbledon Championships, where she made her debut having not participated in the qualifying rounds previously.

At the 2021 Chicago Women's Open Gracheva reached her first career WTA semifinal when she defeated fourth seed Tamara Zidanšek and upset eight seed Marta Kostyuk in three sets, avenging her Roland Garros defeat. She was a set away from her maiden WTA final, but could not hold onto her lead as she lost to Alizé Cornet, winning just one game after taking the opening set having played two matches a day.

She defended her points at the US Open, where she stunned 24th seed Paula Badosa (who would reach the top 10 two months later) in straight sets to reach the third round for the second consecutive year. Gracheva's run ended in the hands of 14th seed Anastasia Pavlyuchenkova, in straight sets.

The Russian reached her third quarterfinal of the year at the Astana Open as the seventh seed, defeating Kristýna Plíšková and Lesia Tsurenko in straight sets. At the Tenerife Ladies Open, she pulled off yet another big comeback, this time coming over the higher-ranked Sara Sorribes Tormo in the first round after overturning a 1–5 final set deficit to prevail after more than 3 and a half hours of action.

Gracheva ended the season with a semifinal appearance at the Open de Limoges, finishing the year inside the top 80 for the first time in her career.

2022: Second French Open third round, top 60 debut
Gracheva started into the year at the Melbourne Summer Set but was soundly beaten by Sorana Cîrstea without winning a game. Her poor run extended with a first-round exit at the Australian Open, falling to qualifier Lucia Bronzetti in three sets.

At the St. Petersburg Ladies' Trophy she qualified for the main draw. At the Dubai Championships, she defeated Ajla Tomljanović in the first round after also winning three qualifying rounds. As a result, she reached a new career-high ranking of No. 72 after the tournament.

She reached the third round at the French Open for the second time in her career. As a result, she reached a career-high ranking of No. 59, on 18 July 2022.

2023: Australian Open third round, two top-10 wins, first final, WTA 1000 fourth round
She reached the Australian Open third round for the first time in her career defeating eight seed Daria Kasatkina, her first top-10 win, and Lucrezia Stefanini.

At the Mérida Open, she reached the round of 16 as a lucky loser defeating Tatjana Maria before losing to Sloane Stephens. The following week she reached the quarterfinals at the ATX Open defeating top seed Magda Linette and Anna Blinkova. Next she defeated Americans fifth seed Sloane Stephens in the quarterfinals and Katie Volynets in the semifinals to reach her first WTA final. She lost to Ukrainian Marta Kostyuk in straight sets.

She made her debut in Indian Wells as a qualifier and reached the fourth round for the first time in her career at the WTA 1000 level defeating qualifier Ysaline Bonaventure, 25th seed Petra Martic and again 8th seed compatriot Daria Kasatkina, her second top-10 win in two months.

Performance timelines

Only main-draw results in WTA Tour, Grand Slam tournaments, Fed Cup/Billie Jean King Cup and Olympic Games are included in win–loss records.

Singles
Current after the 2023 ATX Open.

Doubles

WTA career finals

Singles: 1 (runner-up)

ITF Circuit finals

Singles: 9 (7 titles, 2 runner-ups)

Top 10 wins

Notes

References

External links
 
 

2000 births
Living people
Russian female tennis players